The Ghana worm lizard (Cynisca kraussi) is a worm lizard species in the family Amphisbaenidae. It is endemic to Ghana.

References

Cynisca (lizard)
Reptiles described in 1878
Taxa named by Wilhelm Peters
Endemic fauna of Ghana